Ncue is a town in Equatorial Guinea. It is located in the province of Kié-Ntem, and it had a population of 1683 as of 2005.

Populated places in Kié-Ntem